Occupy Pittsburgh was a collaboration that has included peaceful protests and demonstrations, with an aim to overcome economic inequality, corporate greed and the influence of corporations and lobbyists on government. The protest has taken place at several locations in Pittsburgh, notably Market Square, Mellon Green and the city's Oakland neighborhood adjacent to the University of Pittsburgh and Carnegie Mellon University. and East Liberty neighborhood.

As of June 2012, Occupy Pittsburgh had continued to engage in organized meetings, events and actions.

Overview
The protests began on October 15, 2011 and drew as many as 4,000 people. The protests included an encampment at Mellon Green. Although the park is privately owned by BNY Mellon, it initially did not request protesters to vacate, the movement citing the "public space" provisions of the city code to justify their occupation. After BNY Mellon filed in court on December 12, 2011 to end the encampment, Occupy Pittsburgh members responded by serving notice to evict the corporation from Pittsburgh.

On February 8, 2012, the movement peacefully left Mellon Green after a court order was issued.

See also

Related portals:

References

Further reading

External links

 
 Photos
 More photos

Occupy movement in the United States
History of Pittsburgh
2011 in Pennsylvania
Culture of Pittsburgh
Organizations based in Pittsburgh